× Howeara, abbreviated as Hwra. in the horticultural trade, is the nothogenus for intergeneric hybrid of the three genera Leochilus, Oncidium and Rodriguezia (Lchs. × Onc. × Rdza.).

The most known hybrids are:
Hwra. Mini-Primi = × Rodricidium Primi × Leochilus oncidioides
Hwra. Lava Burst = Hwra. Mini-Primi × Rodriguezia secunda
Hwra. Leila Groll = Hwra. Mini-Primi × Oncidium sotoanum
Zka. Mary Eliza = Hwra. Mini-Primi × Zelenkoa onusta

References

Orchid nothogenera
Oncidiinae